Patrik Ulf Anders Carlgren (born 8 January 1992) is a Swedish professional footballer who plays as a goalkeeper for Danish Superliga club Randers FC.

Club career
Carlgren progressed through the youth teams of Samuelsdals IF. He started his senior career spending two years with Falu FK. Afterwards, he played two seasons for IK Brage in Superettan, making 23 appearances.

In July 2013, Carlgren was signed by AIK. He made his Allsvenskan debut on 8 May 2014 against Halmstads BK.

In February 2017, Carlgren signed with Danish Superliga club FC Nordsjælland.

In July 2017, he signed a two-year contract with Turkish Süper Lig club Konyaspor.

On 8 July 2018, Carlgren returned to Denmark to sign a three-year contract with Randers FC. In February 2021, Carlgren extended his contract with the club until 2024.

International career
Carlgren was part of the Swedish team which won the 2015 European Under-21 Championship, saving from Ricardo Esgaio and William Carvalho in the penalty shootout in the final against Portugal, after a 0–0 draw in Prague.

He was called up to the senior Sweden squad to face Denmark for the UEFA Euro 2016 play-off in November 2015. Carlgren was a squad player at Euro 2016, serving as a backup goalkeeper behind Andreas Isaksson and Robin Olsen.

Career statistics

Honours
Randers
Danish Cup: 2020–21

Sweden U21
UEFA European Under-21 Championship: 2015

References

External links
 
 

1992 births
Living people
People from Falun
Association football goalkeepers
Swedish footballers
Sweden international footballers
Sweden under-21 international footballers
Swedish expatriate footballers
Allsvenskan players
Superettan players
Division 2 (Swedish football) players
Division 3 (Swedish football) players
Danish Superliga players
Süper Lig players
AIK Fotboll players
IK Brage players
Konyaspor footballers
FC Nordsjælland players
Randers FC players
Expatriate men's footballers in Denmark
Swedish expatriate sportspeople in Denmark
Expatriate footballers in Turkey
Swedish expatriate sportspeople in Turkey
UEFA Euro 2016 players
Sportspeople from Dalarna County